Muston is a village and civil parish, in the Scarborough district of North Yorkshire, England.

History
According to the A Dictionary of British Place Names 'Muston' is derived from either the 12th-century "mouse infected farmstead", or a "farmstead of a man called Musi", being an Old Norse person name with the Old English 'tun' (farmstead or enclosure).

Muston is listed in the Domesday Book as "Mustone", in the Torbar Hundred of the East Riding of Yorkshire. The settlement included seven households, twenty-one villagers, six smallholders, and ten ploughlands. In 1066 Karli son of Karli held the Lordship, this transferring in 1086 to Gilbert of Ghent who also became Tenant-in-chief to  King William I.

In 1823 Muston was a village and civil parish in the Wapentake of Dickering in the East Riding of Yorkshire. The ecclesiastical parish was a Vicarage held by the Archdeacon of Cleveland, Francis Wrangham. Population at the time was 350. Occupations included fourteen farmers, two butchers, two carpenters, three grocers, a tanner, a bricklayer, a corn miller, a shoemaker, an earthenware dealer, a tailor, a blacksmith, and the landlady of The Cross Keys public house. A daily coach linked Muston to Hull and Scarborough. A carrier operated between the village and Bridlington, Hunmanby and Filey twice weekly.

The 1863 parish church of All Saints' was designated a Grade II listed building in 1966.

There is a derelict windmill on the outskirts of the village, just off the A1039 road. References to a mill first appear in 1341. The current mill is thought to have been built in 1826 and was in use until 1932.

Muston became part of North Yorkshire upon local government reorganisation in 1974.

Community
According to the 2011 UK Census, Muston parish had a population of 339, an increase on the 2001 UK census figure of 325.

Muston is on the Yorkshire Wolds Way National Trail, a long-distance footpath.

In July and August, Muston hosts its annual week-long scarecrow festival.

The village cricket team, Muston CC, plays in the Derwent Valley 'A' league.

Gallery

References

External links 
 
 All Saints Church, Muston
 Muston Scarecrow Festival (Gallery)
 "The Ancient Parish of Muston", Genuki

Villages in North Yorkshire
Civil parishes in North Yorkshire